Bout It is the second studio album by American singer Jesse Powell. It was released by Silas Records on September 8, 1998 in the United States. It was Powell's first album to chart on the US Billboard 200, peaking at number 63. For sales in excess of 600,000 copies, Bout It was certified gold by the Recording Industry Association of America (RIAA) on June 8, 1999. Three singles were released from the album, including "I Wasn't with It", "You" and Bout It, 'Bout It". "You" is Powell's only hit to date on the US Billboard Hot 100, peaking at number 10 in 1999.

Critical reception

Allmusic editor Craig Lytle found that Bout It "isn't a gem but is generally decent. The singer doesn't incorporate an abundance of rapping (something many jeep soulsters were doing), but his producers do favor a very hip-hop-ish production style on "Up and Down," "I Wasn't with It," and other selections. Powell doesn't provide anything for the dancefloor – most of the time, he gets into a comfortable medium-tempo groove, whether he's being romantic or overtly sexual. Not a remarkable CD, but competent and usually likable."

Track listing

Notes
 denotes co-producer

Personnel 

 Gerald Albright – Saxophone
 Carter Bradley – Make-Up
 James "Chip" Bunton – Production Coordination
 LaShawn Daniels – Engineer, Vocal Producer
 Felipe Darrell – Associate Executive Producer
 Kevin "KD" Davis – Mixing
 Ken Deranteriasian – Engineer
 Joey Elias – backing vocals, Producer
 Paul "PE" Elliot – Engineer
 Paul Erickson – Engineer
 Mark J. Feist – Producer, Engineer, Mixing
 Ben Garrison – Mixing
 Jeff Gibbs – Engineer
 Rawle Gittens – Engineer
 Reno Greenfield – Drum Programming
 Susan Herndon – Engineer
 Ashley Ingram – Multi-instruments, Producer
 Jhane Isaacs – Stylist
 Eric Jackson – Guitar
 Fred Jenkins III – Multi-instruments, Producer, Mixing
 Rodney Jerkins – Producer, Mixing, Vocal Producer
 Jon-John – Multi-instruments, Producer
 Kenny "K-Smoove" Kornegay – Producer

 L.D.J. – Multi Instruments, Producer
 Tim "Flash" Mariner – Engineer
 Manny Marroquin – Engineer, Mixing
 Meire Murakami – Design
 Kenji Nakai – Engineer, Mixing
 Ashley Pigford – Design
 Catrina Powell – backing vocals
 Jacob Powell – backing vocals
 Jesse Powell – Vocals, backing vocals, Producer
 Tamara Powell – backing vocals
 Chris Puram – Mixing
 Jon-John Robinson – Producer
 Pete Rock – Producer, Remixing
 Carl Roland – Programming, Multi-instruments, Producer
 Sauce Money – Rap
 Louis Silas Jr. – Executive Producer
 Dwight Sills – Acoustic guitar, Producer
 Dexter Simmons – Mixing
 Michael Stokes – Engineer, Mixing, Production Supervisor
 Joe Warlick – Assistant Engineer, Mixing Assistant
 Emerald Williams – backing vocals
 Darryl Young – Producer

Charts

Weekly charts

Year-end charts

Certifications

References

External links
 

1998 albums
Albums produced by Louis Silas Jr.
Jesse Powell albums
Silas Records albums